Judge Keenan may refer to:

Barbara Milano Keenan (born 1950), judge of United States Court of Appeals for the Fourth Circuit
John F. Keenan (born 1929), judge for the United States District Court for the Southern District of New York